The Fifth Seal is a 1976 film by Hungarian director Zoltán Fábri based on the 1963 novel with the same name by Hungarian author Ferenc Sánta. It won the Golden Prize at the 10th Moscow International Film Festival and it was entered into the 27th Berlin International Film Festival. The film was also selected as the Hungarian entry for the Best Foreign Language Film at the 49th Academy Awards, but was not accepted as a nominee.

Plot 
During the reign of the Arrow Cross Party in World War II, four friends are chatting around the table of a bar owned by Béla (Ferenc Bencze) when a wounded photographer (István Dégi) who has just come back from the battlefront joins them. During their gathering, two Arrow Cross officers come in for a drink. After leaving, the group bitterly refer to them as murderers.

One of the friends, a watchmaker named Miklós Gyuricza (Lajos Öze), poses a moral question to János (Sándor Horváth) about two hypothetical characters; Tomóceusz Katatiki and Gyugyu.

Tomóceusz Katatiki was the leader of an imaginary island, and Gyugyu was his slave. The powerful and careless Katatiki treated the poor Gyugyu with extreme brutality, but never felt any remorse as he lived by the barbarian morality of his age. Gyugyu lived in misery and suffering but found comfort in the fact that whatever cruelty happens to him it is never caused by him and he is still a guiltless person with a clean conscience. What would he choose, if he had to die and reincarnate as one of them?

The photographer says that he would choose Gyugyu, but the others don't believe him. As they go home we get to know some of the deepest secrets of their lives. It turns out that Gyuricza is hiding Jewish children at his flat. Meanwhile, László (László Márkus) drinks excessively, plagued with the question Gyuricza posed, and experiences hallucinations in his drunken stupor. Upset that the four bar attendees didn't believe him about Gyugyu, the photographer reports the four of them to the Arrow Cross Party for calling the Arrow Cross officers 'murderers'.

The next evening, the four friends are at the bar again when arrow-cross officers arrest them. They are taken to an office of the party where an arrow-cross official (Zoltán Latinovits) forces them to slap a dying partisan in the face in order to be freed. Gyuricza is the only one that complies. Gyuricza exits the building, severely disturbed by what transpired. As he walks through the city, buildings explode and crumble.

Cast
 Lajos Őze - Miklós Gyuricza (Gyuricza Miklós)
 László Márkus - László Király (Király László)
 Ferenc Bencze - Béla
 Sándor Horváth - János Kovács (Kovács János)
 István Dégi - Károly Keszei (Keszei Károly)
 Zoltán Latinovits - civvies
 Gábor Nagy - the blonde one
 György Bánffy - the high one
 József Vándor - Macák
 Noémi Apor - Mrs Kovács (Kovácsné)
 Ildikó Pécsi - Irén
 Marianna Moór - Lucy (as Moór Mariann)
 Rita Békés - Erzsi
 György Cserhalmi - dying communist
 Gábor Kiss - Guard
 Gabriella Kiss - Gyuricza's daughter

See also
 List of submissions to the 49th Academy Awards for Best Foreign Language Film
 List of Hungarian submissions for the Academy Award for Best Foreign Language Film

References

External links

1976 films
1970s war drama films
1976 drama films
1970s Hungarian-language films
Films directed by Zoltán Fábri
Hungarian World War II films
Hungarian war drama films